French Park may refer to:

French Park, New South Wales, rural village community in Riverina, New South Wales, Australia
French Park (Amberley, Ohio), public park in Amberley, Ohio, United States
Fuxing Park, public park in Shanghai, China, before 1943 known as "French Park" by locals